Nicole Arrold (born 7 November 1981) is an Australian field hockey player who competed in the 2004 Summer Olympics and in the 2008 Summer Olympics. She also participated at the Commonwealth Games where she won gold medals in 2006 and 2010 respectively.

Inaugural inductee to University of Canberra Sport Walk of Fame in 2022.

References

External links
 

1981 births
Living people
Australian female field hockey players
Olympic field hockey players of Australia
Field hockey players at the 2004 Summer Olympics
Field hockey players at the 2008 Summer Olympics
Sportspeople from Canberra
Commonwealth Games medallists in field hockey
Commonwealth Games gold medallists for Australia
ACT Academy of Sport alumni
Field hockey players at the 2006 Commonwealth Games
Field hockey players at the 2010 Commonwealth Games
University of Canberra alumni
21st-century Australian women
Medallists at the 2006 Commonwealth Games
Medallists at the 2010 Commonwealth Games